Mattias Erik Timander (born April 16, 1974) is a Swedish former professional ice hockey defenceman. He played eight seasons in the National Hockey League (NHL) for the Boston Bruins, Columbus Blue Jackets, New York Islanders and Philadelphia Flyers between 1996 and 2004. The rest of his career, which lasted from 1993 to 2013, was mainly spent in Sweden playing for Modo Hockey and Leksands IF.

Playing career
Drafted 208th overall in the 1992 NHL Entry Draft by the Boston Bruins, Timander came over to North America prior to the 1996–97 season and split his first three seasons between Boston and the Bruins primary affiliate, the Providence Bruins. After spending the entire 1999–2000 season with Boston, Timander was taken by the Columbus Blue Jackets in the 2000 NHL Expansion Draft. He spent the next two seasons with Columbus and was traded to the New York Islanders for a 4th round draft pick (Jekabs Redlihs) prior to the 2002–03 season.

After playing in a career high 80 games in 2002–03, Timander was shifted between the Islanders and their American Hockey League affiliate, the Bridgeport Sound Tigers, in 2003–04. This led to him being traded to the Philadelphia Flyers for a 7th round draft pick (Chris Campoli) on January 22, 2004. He spent the rest of the season with the Flyers, playing in 34 regular season games and adding to what turned out to be a career high plus/minus rating (+13 w/Flyers, +2 w/Islanders, +15 overall). He also took part in all of his new team's 18 playoff games, coming one win short of a trip to the Stanley Cup Finals.

He returned to Sweden in the off-season to play for Modo Hockey in the Elitserien where he left after the 2010–11 season.

On July 25, 2011, Timander signed a one-year contract (with an optional one-year extension) with the Leksands IF of the HockeyAllsvenskan. In May 2013, Timander officially announced his retirement.

Career statistics

Regular season and playoffs

International

Awards and honours

References

External links
 

1974 births
Living people
Boston Bruins draft picks
Boston Bruins players
Bridgeport Sound Tigers players
Columbus Blue Jackets players
Leksands IF players
Modo Hockey players
New York Islanders players
People from Sollefteå Municipality
Philadelphia Flyers players
Providence Bruins players
Swedish ice hockey defencemen
Sportspeople from Västernorrland County